The Measure of Man is a documentary film about global ecological problems told via personal stories.

The documentary was produced in Estonia in 2010. Film director is Marianne Kõrver, script by Kaie Kotov and Marianne Kõrver.

The film presents stories from a well-off lawyer in the rush of Manhattan, a young barber in ancient town of Hasankeyf in Turkey, a family of fisherman on Lake Tonle Sap in Cambodia, and a publisher in the all-eco quarter Vauban in Freiburg in Germany.

This is the first Estonian film on environmental issues that presents global problem using original shoots from all continents. Its theoretical background is taken from ecosemiotics and semiotics of landscape, not used earlier in such a way.

Awards
Audience Choice award from Cinema Planeta 2011.
Jury's Special Prize from Matsalu Nature Film Festival 2011.

See also
The Measure of a Man (Star Trek: The Next Generation)

References

External links
The Measure of Man in the Estonian Film Database
Film's trailer

Estonian documentary films
2011 films
Documentary films about environmental issues
2011 documentary films
2010s English-language films